Vladimír Borovička (born 25 March 1954 in Děčín) is a Czech football coach.

Playing career
Borovička played as a goalkeeper. He played for Bohemians Prague and Dukla Banská Bystrica in the Czechoslovak league.

Coaching career 
Borovička worked as a Zenit St. Petersburg's caretaking manager in May 2006 after the departure of the fellow Czech Vlastimil Petržela. He since returned to his coaching duties.

References

External links
  Profile at the official FC Zenit St. Petersburg website

1954 births
Living people
People from Děčín
Czechoslovak footballers
Czechoslovakia international footballers
Czechoslovak expatriate footballers
Bohemians 1905 players
FK Dukla Banská Bystrica players
Expatriate footballers in Austria
Czech football managers
Czechoslovak football managers
FC Zenit Saint Petersburg managers
Russian Premier League managers
AC Sparta Prague managers
Expatriate football managers in Russia
Czechoslovak expatriate sportspeople in Austria
Czech expatriate sportspeople in Russia
Bohemians 1905 managers
Association football goalkeepers
Sportspeople from the Ústí nad Labem Region